Synchiropus claudiae, the Claudia's dragonet, is a species of fish in the family Callionymidae, the dragonets. It is found in the Western Central Pacific.

The maximum length of this species is 2.2 cm (0.87 in).

Etymology
The fish is named in honor of Fricke’s sister, Claudia Grünhagen, because of her “continued interest in and support of [his] studies on callionymid fishes”.

References

claudiae
Fish of the Pacific Ocean
Fish of East Asia
Taxa named by Ronald Fricke
Fish described in 1990